Martina Colombari (born 10 July 1975) is an Italian film and television actress, model and television presenter.

Biography
Colombari was born on 10 July 1975 in Riccione in northern Italy.

In October 1991, at the age of 16, Colombari won the Miss Italia beauty pageant, becoming the competition's youngest winner at the time. Later, she hosted or co-hosted several Italian television programmes, including Un disco per l'estate, Vota la voce, Super, Goleada (originally titled Galagoal) and Controcampo. She played a lead role in What Girls Never Say (2000),  directed by Carlo Vanzina, and appeared in other films such as Paparazzi (1998) and She (2001), directed by Neri Parenti and Timothy Bond, respectively. She also held a recurring role in the television series Carabinieri.

Colombari has featured on the covers of multiple magazines, including the Italian editions of Cosmopolitan (May 1997) and GQ (December 2000), the Italian men's magazine Max (July 1999, April 2003, and October 2008), and others such as Diva (2007), Intimità (2007), and Confidenze (2008).

In 2011, Colombari published an autobiography titled La vita è una.

Personal life
In 2004, Colombari married long-time A.C. Milan player Alessandro Costacurta, and the couple have a son, Achilles. Notwithstanding her husband's lengthy career with Milan, she supports Juventus.

References

Further reading

External links

 
 
 
 

1975 births
Living people
Italian beauty pageant winners
Italian female models
Italian film actresses
Italian television actresses
Italian television presenters
Italian women television presenters
Association footballers' wives and girlfriends